Canada has competed at the Hopman Cup tennis tournament on four occasions, in 2004, 2014, 2015 and 2018. In 2004, the team of Maureen Drake and Frank Dancevic was defeated in the qualification play-off and as such did not compete in the round robin, except to stand in for the injured Belgium team for the final round robin tie against Hungary. Milos Raonic and Eugenie Bouchard represented Canada in 2014 and finished second in Group A. Bouchard represented Canada once again in 2015, this time with Vasek Pospisil, and ranked second in Group A for the second straight year. Bouchard and Pospisil represented Canada in 2018 and finished last in their group.

Players
This is a list of players who have played for Canada in the Hopman Cup.

Results

1 Despite losing the qualification play-off against Hungary in 2004, Canada replaced the injured Belgium team for their final round robin tie (again against the Hungarian team) where they conceded the mixed doubles dead rubber as a walkover.

References

Hopman Cup teams
Hopman Cup